Elias II or Eliya II may refer to:

 Elias II of Périgord (996–1031)
 Elias II, Count of Maine (died in 1151)
 Elias II of Alexandria, Greek Patriarch of Alexandria in 1171–1175
 Elias II of Seleucia-Ctesiphon, Patriarch of the Church of the East in 1111-1132

See also
 Elias (disambiguation)
 Elijah (disambiguation)